Meridale is a hamlet in Delaware County, New York, United States. Meridale has a post office with ZIP code 13806, which opened on May 4, 1876.

References

Hamlets in Delaware County, New York
Hamlets in New York (state)